Etemad or Etemaad (in Persian اعتماد lit. Trust; correct transcription: ettemād, because in pronunciation the letter "t" is duplicated) is a newspaper in Iran.

Etemad or Etemaad may also refer to:

People 
 Akbar Etemad (born 1930), Iranian scientist and the first head of the Atomic Energy Organization of Iran
 Yasmine Etemad Amini (born 1968), lawyer and wife of Reza Pahlavi
 Mirza Aqa Khan Nuri (1807–1865), Iranian politician known as Etemad al-Dawla

Places 
 Etemad, Iran, an alternate name of the village Qarah Saqqal-e Olya

Publications 
 Indian Etemaad, also known as Etemaad Daily, a newspaper in India